Mauricio José Moreira Guarino (born 18 July 1995) is a Uruguayan cyclist, who currently rides for UCI Continental team . On August 15, 2022, Moreira won the Tour of Portugal, having conquered the yellow jersey during the final stage, an individual time trial.

Major results

2012
 1st  Time trial, National Junior Road Championships
2013
 National Junior Road Championships
1st  Road race
2nd Time trial
2015
 2nd Road race, National Under-23 Road Championships
2016
 1st  Time trial, National Under-23 Road Championships
 4th Time trial, National Road Championships
2017
 1st  Time trial, National Under-23 Road Championships
 4th Time trial, National Road Championships
2018
 4th Overall Volta ao Alentejo
2019
 2nd Overall Boucles de la Mayenne
1st Stage 1
2020
 1st  Overall Volta a la Comunitat Valenciana
2021
 1st  Overall Volta ao Alentejo
1st Stage 5 (ITT)
 2nd Overall Volta a Portugal
1st Combination classification
1st Stage 9
 3rd Vuelta a Castilla y León
2022
 1st  Overall Volta a Portugal
1st Stages 3 & 10

References

External links

1995 births
Living people
Uruguayan male cyclists
Sportspeople from Salto, Uruguay